Stanley J. Brasher (May 4, 1928 – September 6, 2021) was an American politician. He served as a member of the New Mexico House of Representatives.

Life and career 
Brasher was born in Santa Rosa, New Mexico. He attended Albuquerque High School and the University of New Mexico.

Brasher served in the New Mexico House of Representatives from 1959 to 1965.

Brasher died in September 2021, at the age of 93.

References 

1928 births
2021 deaths
People from Santa Rosa, New Mexico
New Mexico Democrats
Members of the New Mexico House of Representatives
20th-century American politicians
University of New Mexico alumni